Malaysia competed in the 1978 Asian Games held in Bangkok, Thailand from 9 to 20 September 1978. Athletes from Malaysia won overall six medal and finished 12th in a medal table.

Medal summary

Medals by sport

Medallists

Athletics

Men
Road event

Women
Track event

Basketball

Men's tournament
Group B

Seventh to fourteenth place classification

Ranked 7th in final standings

Women's tournament
Final round

Ranked 5th in final standings

Boxing

Field hockey

Men's tournament
Bronze medal match

Ranked 3rd in final standings

Football

Men's tournament
Preliminary round; Group C

Semifinal; Group 2

Ranked 7th in final standings

References

Nations at the 1978 Asian Games
1978
Asian Games